Ormsby may refer to:

Places
United States
 Ormsby, Minnesota
 Ormsby, Wisconsin
 Ormsby County, Nevada
 Carrick (Pittsburgh), Pennsylvania, neighborhood formerly known as Ormsby or the Ormsby tract

United Kingdom
 South Ormsby, village in Lincolnshire, England

Other uses
 Ormsby (surname)
 USS Ormsby (APA-49), Ormsby-class attack transport ship

See also
 Ormesby, a suburb of Middlesbrough
 Ormesby St Margaret, a village in Norfolk
 Ormesby St Michael, a village in Norfolk
 Ormesby Broad, a marsh in Norfolk